Jamshid Khan (born 3 March 2003) is an Afghan cricketer. He made his first-class debut for Amo Region in the 2017–18 Ahmad Shah Abdali 4-day Tournament on 20 October 2017. He made his List A debut for Amo Region in the 2018 Ghazi Amanullah Khan Regional One Day Tournament on 23 July 2018.

In December 2019, he was named in Afghanistan's squad for the 2020 Under-19 Cricket World Cup.

References

External links
 

2003 births
Living people
Afghan cricketers
Amo Sharks cricketers
Place of birth missing (living people)